Owner's Manual is an American reality television series that airs on AMC and premiered on August 15, 2013. Announced in November 2012, the series' first season consists of eight, half-hour episodes. Owner's Manual tests whether it is best to read the included owner’s manual or not by representing each side of the divide in a weekly challenge. Ed Sanders and Marcus Hunt attempt to operate machinery and technology each week with one man working strictly from the manual and the other using his instincts.

Episodes

Reception
Robert Lloyd of The Los Angeles Times says the show is guided by charm and pretense. Melissa Camacho of Common Sense Media gave the show 3 out of 5 stars saying that while the show is not the most sophisticated of shows, watching how the two handle things is interesting.

References

External links
 
 Owner's Manual on Internet Movie Database
 Owner's Manual on TV.com

2010s American reality television series
2013 American television series debuts
2013 American television series endings
AMC (TV channel) original programming